Kilcotton GAA is a Gaelic Athletic Association hurling club in County Laois, Ireland. The club colours are green with gold trim and a white sash.

History
In the early part of the 20th century the club won 10 Laois Senior Hurling Championship titles between the years 1904 and 1929.

At underage grades the club combines with its neighbouring club Borris-in-Ossory.

Honours
 Laois Senior Hurling Championship: (10) 1904, 1905, 1906, 1909, 1913, 1919, 1920, 1923, 1924, 1929
 Laois Intermediate Hurling Championship (3) 1984, 1991, 2002 
 Laois Junior B Hurling Championship (1) 2005
 Laois All-County Hurling League (1) 2004

Notable players
Kilcotton players to have played for Laois at senior level include Brian Stapleton, Paul Drennan, Owen Bergin, Owen Coss and John Fitzpatrick.

References

Gaelic games clubs in County Laois
Hurling clubs in County Laois